The 2023 Wisconsin Badgers football team represent the University of Wisconsin–Madison in the 2023 NCAA Division I FBS football season. The Badgers are led by first-year head coach Luke Fickell. And compete as members of the West Division of the Big Ten Conference. They will play their home games at Camp Randall Stadium in Madison, Wisconsin.

Previous season 
The Badgers finished the 2022 season 7–6, 4–5 in Big Ten play to finish in fifth place in the West division. They received an invitation to the Guaranteed Rate Bowl where they defeated Oklahoma State.

On October 2, 2022, the school fired head coach Paul Chryst, who was in his eighth season as head coach. Defensive coordinator Jim Leonhard assumed interim head coaching duties after the dismissal of Chryst. On November 21, the school named Cincinnati coach Luke Fickell the team's new head coach.

Offseason

2023 NFL draft

Transfers
Outgoing

Incoming

Preseason

Spring game
The Badgers are scheduled to hold a spring game titled "The Launch" on April 22, 2023 at Camp Randall Stadium.

Preseason Big Ten poll

Personnel

Coaching staff

Roster

Source:

Schedule

References

Wisconsin
Wisconsin Badgers football seasons
Wisconsin Badgers football